Carl Jonas Love Malmsjö (born September 2, 1971) is a Swedish actor who has worked in theatre, TV and radio; he is the son of Swedish actor Jan Malmsjö and the Swedish actress Marie Göranzon. Apart from his work in his native Sweden, which has included a starring role in the TV series Labyrint, he has been in several productions directed by Ingmar Bergman at the Brooklyn Academy of Music. He was also cast as Skorpa of the White Horse, a Viking warlord in the second half of The Last Kingdom, a BBC adaptation of the first two books in Bernard Cornwell's The Saxon Stories series of historical novels.

He also contributed the voice of Ingmar Bergman in the Sparks musical, The Seduction of Ingmar Bergman.

References

External links
Official website

1971 births
Living people
Swedish male film actors
Swedish male musical theatre actors
Swedish male television actors
20th-century Swedish male actors
21st-century Swedish male actors
Place of birth missing (living people)